Kim Jong-un (born 8 January 1982) is a North Korean politician who has been the supreme leader of North Korea since 2011 and the leader of the Workers' Party of Korea (WPK) since 2012. He is a son of Kim Jong-il, who was North Korea's second supreme leader from 1994 to 2011, and Ko Yong-hui. He is a grandson of Kim Il-sung, who was the founder and first supreme leader of North Korea from its establishment in 1948 until his death in 1994. Kim Jong-un is the first leader of North Korea to have been born in the country after its founding in 1948.

From late 2010, Kim was viewed as successor to the leadership of North Korea. Following his father's death in December 2011, state television announced Kim as the "Great Successor". Kim holds the titles of WPK general secretary, and president of the State Affairs. He is also a member of the Presidium of the WPK Politburo, the highest decision-making body. In July 2012, Kim was promoted to the highest rank of Marshal in the Korean People's Army, consolidating his position as Supreme Commander of the Armed Forces. North Korean state media often refer to him as "Respected Comrade Kim Jong-un" or "Marshal Kim Jong-un". He has promoted the policy of byungjin, similar to Kim Il-sung's policy from the 1960s, referring to the simultaneous development of both the economy and the country's nuclear weapons program.

Kim rules North Korea as a totalitarian dictatorship, and his leadership has followed the same cult of personality as his father and grandfather. In 2014, a landmark United Nations Human Rights Council report suggested that Kim could be put on trial for crimes against humanity. He has ordered the purge or execution of several North Korean officials; he is also widely believed to have ordered the 2017 assassination of his half-brother, Kim Jong-nam, in Malaysia. He has presided over an expansion of the consumer economy, construction projects and tourist attractions. Kim also expanded North Korea's nuclear program which led to heightened tensions with the United States and South Korea. In 2018 and 2019, Kim took part in summits with South Korean President Moon Jae-in and US President Donald Trump. He has claimed success in combatting the COVID-19 pandemic in North Korea; the country did not report any confirmed cases until May 2022, although many experts doubt this claim.

Early life
North Korean authorities and state-run media have stated Kim's birthdate was 8 January 1982, but South Korean intelligence officials believe the actual date is a year later. It is thought that Kim's official birthyear was changed for symbolic reasons; 1982 marks 70 years after the birth of his grandfather, Kim Il-sung, and 40 years after the official birth of his father Kim Jong-il. Before 2018, the US Treasury Department listed Kim Jong-un's birthdate as 8 January 1984. Now, the birthdate is listed as 8 January 1983, aligning with South Korea's birthdate for Kim Jong-un. The claim that he was born in 1984 matches that given by his aunt and uncle, who moved to the United States in 1998 and were interrogated by the CIA.

Kim Jong-un is the second of the three children of Ko Yong-hui and Kim Jong-il; his elder brother Kim Jong-chul was born in 1981, while his younger sister, Kim Yo-jong, is believed to have been born in 1987. He is a grandson of Kim Il-sung, who was the founder of and led North Korea from its establishment in 1948 until his death in 1994. Kim is the first leader of North Korea to have been born a North Korean citizen, his father having been born in the Soviet Union and his grandfather having been born during the Japanese colonial period.

All the children of Kim Jong-il are said to have lived in Switzerland, as well as the mother of the two youngest sons, who lived in Geneva for some time.
First reports said that Kim Jong-un attended the private International School of Berne in Gümligen in Switzerland under the name "Chol-pak" or "Pak-chol" from 1993 to 1998. He was described as shy, a good student who got along well with his classmates, and was a basketball fan. He was chaperoned by an older student, who was thought to be his bodyguard. However, it was later suggested that the student at the Gümligen school was not Kim Jong-un, but his elder brother Kim Jong-chul.

Later, it was reported that Kim Jong-un attended the Liebefeld Steinhölzli state school in Köniz near Bern under the name "Pak-un" or "Un-pak" from 1998 until 2000 as the son of an employee of the North Korean embassy in Bern. Authorities confirmed that a North Korean student from North Korea attended the school during that period. Pak-un first attended a special class for foreign-language children and later attended the regular classes of the 6th, 7th, 8th and part of the final 9th year, leaving the school abruptly in the autumn of 2000. He was described as a well-integrated and ambitious student who liked to play basketball. However, his grades and attendance rating are reported to have been poor. The ambassador of North Korea in Switzerland, Ri Chol, had a close relationship with him and acted as a mentor. One of Pak-un's classmates told reporters that he had told him that he was the son of the leader of North Korea. According to some reports, Kim was described by classmates as a shy child who was awkward with girls and indifferent to political issues, but who distinguished himself in sports and had a fascination with the American National Basketball Association and Michael Jordan. One friend claimed that he had been shown pictures of Pak-un with Kobe Bryant and Toni Kukoč.

In April 2012, new documents came to light indicating that Kim Jong-un had lived in Switzerland since 1991 or 1992, earlier than previously thought.

The Laboratory of Anatomic Anthropology at the University of Lyon, France, compared the picture of Pak-un taken at the Liebefeld Steinhölzli school in 1999 with a picture of Kim Jong-un from 2012 and concluded that the faces show a conformity of 95%, suggesting that it is most likely that they are the same person.

The Washington Post reported in 2009 that Kim Jong-un's school friends recalled he "spent hours doing meticulous pencil drawings of Chicago Bulls superstar Michael Jordan". He was obsessed with basketball and computer games, and was a fan of Jackie Chan action movies.

Most analysts agree that Kim Jong-un attended Kim Il-sung University, a leading officer-training school in Pyongyang, from 2002 to 2007. Kim obtained two degrees, one in physics at Kim Il-sung University and another as an Army officer at the Kim Il-sung Military University.

In late February 2018, Reuters reported that Kim and his father had used forged passports—supposedly issued by Brazil and dated 26 February 1996—to apply for visas in various countries. Both 10-year passports carry a stamp saying "Embassy of Brazil in Prague". Kim Jong-un's passport records the name "Josef Pwag" and a date of birth of 1 February 1983.

For many years, only one confirmed photograph of him was known to exist outside North Korea, apparently taken in the mid-1990s, when he was eleven. Occasionally, other supposed images of him surfaced but were often disputed. It was only in June 2010, shortly before he was given official posts and publicly introduced to the North Korean people, that more pictures were released of Kim, taken when he was attending school in Switzerland. The first official image of him as an adult was a group photograph released on 30 September 2010, at the end of the party conference that effectively anointed him, in which he is seated in the front row, two places from his father. This was followed by newsreel footage of him attending the conference.

Succession

Pre-2010 Party Conference speculation 
Kim Jong-un's eldest half-brother, Kim Jong-nam, had been the favorite to succeed, but reportedly fell out of favor after 2001, when he was caught attempting to enter Japan on a fake passport to visit Tokyo Disneyland. Kim Jong-nam was killed in Malaysia in 2017 by suspected North Korean agents.

Kim Jong-il's former personal chef, Kenji Fujimoto, revealed details regarding Kim Jong-un, with whom he had a good relationship, stating that he was favored to be his father's successor. Fujimoto also said that Jong-un was favored by his father over his elder brother, Kim Jong-chul, reasoning that Jong-chul is too feminine in character, while Jong-un is "exactly like his father". Furthermore, Fujimoto stated that "if power is to be handed over then Jong-un is the best for it. He has superb physical gifts, is a big drinker and never admits defeat." Also, according to Fujimoto, Jong-un smokes Yves Saint Laurent cigarettes, loves Johnnie Walker whisky and has a Mercedes-Benz 600 luxury sedan. When Jong-un was 18, Fujimoto described an episode where Jong-un once questioned his lavish lifestyle and asked, "we are here, playing basketball, riding horses, riding jet skis, having fun together. But what of the lives of the average people?" On 15 January 2009, the South Korean news agency Yonhap reported that Kim Jong-il had appointed Kim Jong-un to be his successor.

On 8 March 2009, BBC News reported that Kim Jong-un was on the ballot for 2009 elections to the Supreme People's Assembly, the rubber stamp parliament of North Korea. Subsequent reports indicated that his name did not appear on the list of lawmakers, but he was later elevated to a mid-level position in the National Defense Commission, which is a branch of the North Korean military.

From 2009, it was understood by foreign diplomatic services that Kim was to succeed his father Kim Jong-il as the head of the Korean Workers' Party and de facto leader of North Korea. He has been named "Yŏngmyŏng-han Tongji", which loosely translates to "Brilliant Comrade". His father had also asked embassy staff abroad to pledge loyalty to his son. There have also been reports that citizens in North Korea were encouraged to sing a newly composed "song of praise" to Kim Jong-un, in a similar fashion to that of praise songs relating to Kim Jong-il and Kim Il-sung. Later, in June, Kim was reported to have visited China secretly to "present himself" to the Chinese leadership. The Chinese foreign ministry has strongly denied that this visit occurred.

In September 2009, it was reported that Kim Jong-il had secured support for the succession plan, after a propaganda campaign. It is believed by some that Kim Jong-un was involved in the Cheonan sinking and the bombardment of Yeonpyeong to strengthen his military credentials and facilitate a successful transition of power from his father.

Vice Chairman of the Central Military Commission 
Kim Jong-un was made a daejang, the equivalent of a four-star general in the United States, on 27 September 2010, a day ahead of a rare Workers' Party of Korea conference in Pyongyang, the first time North Korean media had mentioned him by name and despite him having no previous military experience. Despite the promotion, no further details, including verifiable portraits of Kim, were released. On 28 September 2010, he was named vice chairman of the Central Military Commission and appointed to the Central Committee of the Workers' Party, in an apparent nod to become the successor to Kim Jong-il.

On 10 October 2010, Kim Jong-un was alongside his father when he attended the ruling Workers' Party's 65th-anniversary celebration. This was seen as confirming his position as the next leader of the Workers' Party. Unprecedented international press access was granted to the event, further indicating the importance of Kim Jong-un's presence. In January 2011, the regime reportedly began purging around 200 protégés of both Jong-un's uncle-in-law Jang Song-thaek and O Kuk-ryol, the vice chairman of the National Defence Commission, by either detention or execution to further prevent either man from rivaling Jong-un.

Leader of North Korea

Assuming official titles 
On 17 December 2011, Kim Jong-il died. Despite the elder Kim's plans, it was not immediately clear after his death whether Kim Jong-un would in fact take full power, and what his exact role in a new government would be. Some analysts had predicted that when Kim Jong-il died, Jang Song-thaek would act as regent, as Kim Jong-un was too inexperienced to immediately lead the country.

Following his father's death, Kim Jong-un was hailed as the "great successor to the revolutionary cause of Juche", "outstanding leader of the party, army and people", and "respected comrade who is identical to Supreme Commander Kim Jong-il", and was made chairman of the Kim Jong-il funeral committee. The Korean Central News Agency described Kim Jong-un as "a great person born of heaven", a propaganda term only his father and grandfather had enjoyed. The ruling Workers' Party of Korea also said in an editorial, "We vow with bleeding tears to call Kim Jong-un our supreme commander, our leader."

He was publicly declared Supreme Commander of the Korean People's Army on 24 December 2011, and formally appointed to the position on 30 December 2011 when the Political Bureau of the Central Committee of the Workers' Party of Korea "courteously proclaimed that the dear respected Kim Jong Un, vice-chairman of the Central Military Commission of the WPK, assumed the supreme commandership of the Korean People's Army".

On 26 December 2011, the leading North Korean newspaper Rodong Sinmun reported that Kim Jong-un had been acting as chairman of the Central Military Commission, and supreme leader of the country, following his father's demise.

On 9 January 2012, a large rally was held by the Korean People's Army in front of the Kumsusan Palace of the Sun to honor Kim Jong-un and to demonstrate loyalty.

On 27 March 2012, Kim was elected to the Fourth Conference of the Workers' Party of Korea. On 11 April, that conference wrote the post of general secretary out of the party charter and instead designated Kim Jong-il as the party's "Eternal General Secretary". The conference then elected Kim Jong-un as leader of the party under the newly created title of First Secretary. Kim Jong-un also took his father's post as Chairman of the Central Military Commission, as well as his father's old seat on the Politburo Presidium. In a speech made prior to the Conference, Kim Jong-un declared that "Imbuing the whole society with Kimilsungism-Kimjongilism is the highest programme of our Party". On 13 April 2012, the 5th Session of the 12th Supreme People's Assembly appointed Kim Jong-un First Chairman of the National Defence Commission.

On 15 April 2012, during a military parade to commemorate Kim Il-sung's centenary, Kim Jong-un made his first public speech, Let Us March Forward Dynamically Towards Final Victory, Holding Higher the Banner of Songun. That speech became the basis of a hymn dedicated to him, "Onwards Toward the Final Victory".

In July 2012, Kim Jong-un was promoted to wonsu (translated as marshal), the highest active rank in the military. The decision was jointly issued on by the Central Committee and the Central Military Commission of the Workers' Party of Korea, the National Defence Commission, and the Presidium of the Supreme People's Assembly, the Korean Central News Agency subsequently announced. The only higher rank is Taewonsu (roughly translated as Grand Marshal or Generalissimo) which was held by Kim's grandfather, Kim Il-sung, and which was awarded posthumously to his father, Kim Jong-il, in February 2012. The promotion confirmed Kim's role as top leader of the North Korean military and came days after the replacement of Chief of General Staff Ri Yong-ho by Hyon Yong-chol.

In November 2012, satellite photos revealed a half-kilometer-long propaganda message carved into a hillside in Ryanggang Province, reading, "Long Live General Kim Jong-un, the Shining Sun"!

On 30 November 2012, Kim met with Li Jianguo, first-ranking vice chairman of the Chinese National People's Congress Standing Committee, who "briefed Kim on the 18th National Congress of the Communist Party of China", according to the state's official news agency, the Korean Central News Agency. A letter from Xi Jinping, General Secretary of the Chinese Communist Party, was hand-delivered during the discussion.

On 9 March 2014, Kim Jong-un was elected to a seat in the Supreme People's Assembly, the country's unicameral legislature. He ran unopposed, but voters had the choice of voting yes or no. There was a record turnout of voters and, according to government officials, all voted "yes" in his home district of Mount Paekdu. The Supreme People's Assembly subsequently elected him first chairman of the National Defence Commission.

In May 2016, the Workers' Party of Korea held its first congress since 1980. In the congress, Kim became the Chairman of the WPK. On 29 June 2016, Kim became the Chairman of the State Affairs Commission, after the State Affairs Commission replaced the National Defence Commission. The office of the Supreme Commander of the armed forces was linked to this office because of the 2019 constitutional amendment.

In January 2021, the WPK held its 8th congress, in which Kim Jong-un was elected General Secretary of the WPK. The congress also saw the WPK reassert its commitment to communism.

Role in government 
According to the North Korean constitution, Kim Jong-un is part of a triumvirate heading the executive branch of the North Korean government along with Premier Kim Tok-hun and parliament president Choe Ryong-hae. Kim Jong-un commands the armed forces, Kim Tok-hun heads the government and handles domestic affairs, and Choe Ryong-hae handles foreign relations. However, under the constitution, Kim Jong-un is the highest-ranking of the three. Since 1998, the NDC chairmanship has been constitutionally defined as "the highest post in the state", and a constitutional amendment enacted by the regime explicitly named the NDC (first) chairman as "the supreme leader of the Democratic People's Republic of North Korea". However, analysts are divided about how much actual power Kim has.

Kim Jong-un frequently performs symbolic acts that associate him with the personality cult of his father and grandfather. Like them, Kim Jong-un regularly tours the country, giving "on-the-spot guidance" at various sites. North Korean state media often refers to him as "Respected Comrade Kim Jong-un" or "Marshal Kim Jong-un".

New leadership style
In July 2012, Kim Jong-un showed a change in cultural policy from his father by attending a Moranbong Band concert. The concert contained several elements of pop culture from the West, particularly the United States. Kim used this event to introduce his wife to the public, an unprecedented move in North Korea.

In 2012, Kim Jong-il's personal chef Kenji Fujimoto visited North Korea and said, "Stores in Pyongyang were brimming with products and people in the streets looked cheerful. North Korea has changed a lot since Kim Jong-un assumed power. All of this is because of leader Kim Jong-un."

According to analysts, Kim Jong-un has used his resemblance to his grandfather to harness Kim Il-sung's personality cult and popular nostalgia for earlier times. In 2013, Kim copied his grandfather's style when he gave his first New Year's address, a break from the approach of his father, Kim Jong-il, who never made a televised address during his 17 years in power. He has also appeared more accessible and open than his father, hugging and linking arms with young and old. In his public appearances, he appears more active than his father or grandfather, for example, weeding, riding a horse, driving a tank, riding a rollercoaster, or using information technology.

In April 2012, when a satellite launch failed, the government admitted this publicly, the first time it had ever done so. In May 2014, following the collapse of an apartment building in Pyongyang, Kim Jong-un was said to be very upset at the loss of life that resulted. A statement issued by the country's official news agency the Korean Central News Agency used the rare expression "profound consolation and apology". An unnamed government official was quoted by the BBC as saying Kim Jong-un had "sat up all night, feeling painful". While the height of the building and the number of casualties was not released, media reports described it as a 23-story building and indicated that more than a hundred people may have died in the collapse.

Economic policies 
Kim Jong-un has been promoting a policy of byungjin, similar to his grandfather Kim il-sung's policies from the 1960s, developing the national economy in parallel with the nations nuclear weapons program. A set of comprehensive economic measures, the "", were introduced in 2013. The measures increase the autonomy of enterprises by granting them "certain rights to engage in business activities autonomously and elevate the will to labor through appropriately implementing the socialist distribution system". Another priority of economic policies that year was agriculture, where the pojon (vegetable garden) responsibility system was implemented. The system reportedly achieved a major increase in output in some collective farms.
North Korean media were describing the economy as a "flexible collectivist system" where enterprises were applying "active and evolutionary actions" to achieve economic development. These reports reflect Kim's general economic policy of reforming management, increasing the autonomy and incentives for economic actors. This set of reforms known as the "May 30th measures" reaffirms both socialist ownership and "objective economic laws in guidance and management" to improve living standards. Other objectives of the measures are to increase the availability of domestically manufactured goods on markets, introduction of defence innovations into the civilian sector and boost international trade.

There has been a construction boom in Pyongyang, bringing colour and creative architectural styles to the city. While in the past there was a concentration on building monuments, Kim Jong-un's government has constructed amusement parks, aquatic parks, skating rinks, a dolphinarium and a ski resort. Kim has been actively promoting a consumer culture, including entertainment and cosmetics.

Kim has attempted to ease North Korea's food shortages, though the food situation deteriorated during the COVID-19 pandemic. In March 2023, during a WPK plenary session, he called for boosting agricultural production, saying that it is "important to concentrate on increasing the yield at all the farms".

Purges and executions 

As with all reporting on North Korea, reports of purges and executions are difficult to verify. Allegations in 2013 that Kim Jong-un had his ex-girlfriend, singer Hyon Song-wol, executed for violating pornography laws turned out to be false. In May 2016, analysts were surprised to find that General Ri Yong-gil, reported by South Korea to have been executed earlier in the year, was, in fact, alive and well.

In December 2013, Kim Jong-un's uncle Jang Song-thaek was arrested and executed for treachery. Jang is believed to have been executed by firing squad. Yonhap has stated that, according to multiple unnamed sources, Kim Jong-un has also put to death members of Jang's family, to completely destroy all traces of Jang's existence through "extensive executions" of his family, including the children and grandchildren of all close relatives. Those reportedly killed in Kim's purge include Jang's sister Jang Kye-sun, her husband and ambassador to Cuba, Jon Yong-jin, and Jang's nephew and ambassador to Malaysia, Jang Yong-chol. The nephew's two sons were also said to have been killed. At the time of Jang's removal, it was announced that "the discovery and purge of the Jang group ... made our party and revolutionary ranks purer ..." and after his execution on 12 December 2013 state media warned that the army "will never pardon all those who disobey the order of the Supreme Commander".

O Sang-hon was a deputy security minister in the Ministry of People's Security in the government of North Korea who was reportedly killed in a political purge in 2014. According to the South Korean newspaper The Chosun Ilbo, O was executed by flamethrower for his role in supporting Kim Jong-un's uncle Jang Song-taek.

Human rights violations 

In January 2013, the UN High Commissioner for Human Rights Navi Pillay said that the North Korean human rights situation had not improved since Kim had taken power and called for an investigation. A report on the situation of human rights in North Korea in February 2013 by United Nations Special Rapporteur Marzuki Darusman proposed a UN commission of inquiry. The report of the commission of inquiry was published in February 2014 and suggested Kim could "possibly" be made accountable for crimes against humanity at the International Criminal Court.

In July 2016, the United States Department of the Treasury imposed personal sanctions on Kim. Although his involvement in human rights abuses was cited as the reason, officials said the sanctions target the country's nuclear and missile programs. In June 2017, U.S. President Donald Trump condemned Kim Jong-un's "brutal" regime and described Kim as a "madman" after the death of American student Otto Warmbier who had been imprisoned during a visit to North Korea. However, in 2019, President Trump said that he believed Kim was not responsible for Warmbier's death.

Alleged assassination attempts
In 2012, a machine gun was discovered beneath a juniper tree in Ryugyeongwon, located near a route that Kim was going to travel. It was assumed this was part of an assassination attempt.

In May 2017, the North Korean government stated that the Central Intelligence Agency (CIA) of the United States and the South Korean National Intelligence Service (NIS) hired a North Korean lumberjack who worked in Russia to assassinate Kim with a "biochemical weapon" that was both radioactive and nano-poisonous, and whose effect would have been delayed by a few months. North Korea said that it would seek extradition of anyone involved in the assassination attempt.

Nuclear weapons development 

Under Kim Jong-un, North Korea has continued to develop nuclear weapons, testing bombs in February 2013, January and September 2016, and September 2017. As of 2018, North Korea had tested nearly 90 missiles, three times more than in the time of his father and grandfather. By 2023, this climbed up to a total of 226. According to several analysts, North Korea sees the nuclear arsenal as vital to deter an attack, and it is unlikely that North Korea would launch a nuclear war. According to a RAND Corporation senior researcher, Kim Jong-un believes that nuclear weapons are his guarantee of regime survival. In 2022, it was estimated that North Korea has around 45-55 nuclear weapons.

In 2012, on the 100th anniversary of Kim Il-sung's birth, he said, "the days are gone forever when our enemies could blackmail us with nuclear bombs". At a plenary meeting of the Central Committee of the Workers' Party held on 31 March 2013, he announced that North Korea would adopt "a new strategic line on carrying out economic construction and building nuclear armed forces simultaneously".

During the 7th Congress of the Workers' Party of Korea in 2016, Kim Jong-un stated that North Korea would "not use nuclear weapons first unless aggressive hostile forces use nuclear weapons to invade on our sovereignty". However, on other occasions, North Korea has threatened "pre-emptive" nuclear attacks against a US-led attack. In December 2015, Kim stated that his family "turned the DPRK into a powerful nuclear weapons state ready to detonate a self-reliant A-bomb and H-bomb to reliably defend its sovereignty and the dignity of the nation".

In his New Year's Day speech on 2 January 2017, Kim Jong-un said that the country was in the "last stage" of preparations to test-fire an intercontinental ballistic missile (ICBM). On 4 July, North Korea conducted the first publicly announced flight test of its ICBM Hwasong-14, timed to coincide with the U.S. Independence Day celebrations. On 3 September, the country conducted its sixth nuclear test. On 28 November 2017, North Korea tested the Hwasong-15 missile, which became the first ballistic missile developed by North Korea that is theoretically capable of reaching all of the US' mainland. In response, the United Nations Security Council enacted a series of sanctions against North Korea for its nuclear program and missile tests.

Until 2022, North Korea's stated policy position was that nuclear weapons "will never be abused or used as a means for preemptive strike", but if there is an "attempt to have recourse to military force against us" North Korea may use their "most powerful offensive strength in advance to punish them". This was not a full no first use policy. This policy changed in 2022 with a law approved by the Supreme People's Assembly, which states that in the case of an attack against the top leadership or the nuclear command and control system, nuclear attacks against the enemy would be launched automatically. Additionally, the new law indicates that if Kim Jong-un was killed, the authorization of nuclear strikes would pass to a senior official.

Foreign relations

In his 2018 New Year Speech, Kim announced that he was open to dialogue with South Korea with a view to take part in the upcoming Winter Olympics in the South. The Seoul–Pyongyang hotline was reopened after almost two years. North and South Korea marched together in the Olympics opening ceremony, and fielded a united women's ice hockey team. In addition to the athletes, Kim sent an unprecedented high-level delegation including his sister, Kim Yo-jong, and President of the Presidium, Kim Yong-nam, and performers such as the Samjiyon Orchestra. On 5 March, he had a meeting with South Korea's Chief of the National Security Office, Chung Eui-yong, in Pyongyang.

In March 2018, Kim visited Beijing, meeting with General Secretary of the Chinese Communist Party, Xi Jinping, marking his first foreign trip since assuming power.

At the April 2018 inter-Korean summit, Kim and South Korean President Moon Jae-in signed the Panmunjom Declaration, pledging to convert the Korean Armistice Agreement into a full peace treaty, formally ending the Korean War, by the end of the year.

From 7–8 May, Kim made a second visit to China, meeting with Xi Jinping in Dalian.

On 26 May, Kim had a second and unannounced meeting in the North Korean side of Panmunjom, meeting with Moon to discuss his proposed summit with US President Donald Trump in Singapore.

On 10 June, Kim arrived in Singapore and met with Prime Minister Lee Hsien Loong. On 12 June, Kim held his first summit with Trump and signed a declaration, affirming a commitment to peace, nuclear disarmament, and the repatriation of the remains of U.S. war dead. This marked the first-ever meeting between leaders of North Korea and the United States.

In September, Kim held another summit with Moon Jae-in in Pyongyang. Kim agreed to dismantle North Korea's nuclear weapons facilities if the United States took reciprocal action. The two governments also announced that they would establish buffer zones on their borders to prevent clashes.

In February 2019, Kim held another summit with Trump in Hanoi, Vietnam, which Trump cut short on the second day without an agreement. The Trump administration said that the North Koreans wanted complete sanctions relief, while the North Koreans said that they were only asking for partial sanctions relief.

On 25 April 2019, Kim held his first summit with Russian President Vladimir Putin in Vladivostok, Russia. On 30 June 2019, in the Korean DMZ, Kim again met with Trump, shaking hands warmly and expressing hope for peace. Kim and Trump then joined Moon Jae-in for a brief chat. Talks in Stockholm began on 5 October 2019 between US and North Korean negotiating teams, but broke down after one day.

North Korea under Kim supported Russia's invasion of Ukraine in 2022, blaming the "hegemonic policy" of the US for the war, recognizing the independence of the breakaway states of Donetsk and Luhansk People's Republics in Eastern Ukraine as well as recognizing Russia's unilateral annexation of Donetsk, Kherson, Luhansk and Zaporizhzhia oblasts on 30 September. In September 2022, US intelligence said that Russia was buying millions of artillery shells and rockets from North Korea due to the sanctions caused by Russia's invasion of Ukraine. A February 2023 report by the Center for Strategic International Studies (CSIS) stated that after dropping to nearly zero during the COVID-19 era, trade between North Korea and Russia rebounded back to prepandemic levels.

During the COVID-19 pandemic

During 2020, Kim claimed success in combatting the COVID-19 pandemic in North Korea, after putting the country in isolation and limiting public gatherings.

In April 2020, a three-week absence from public view led to speculation that Kim was seriously ill or dead, but no clear evidence of any health problem came to light. He continued to appear in public rarely over the following months, possibly because of health problems or the risk of COVID-19. In August, it was reported that Kim had ceded a degree of authority to his sister, Kim Yo-jong, giving her responsibility for relations with South Korea and the United States and making her his de facto second-in-command.

On 5 September 2020, Kim toured the areas hit by Typhoon Maysak. He also replaced the local provincial party committee chairman and ordered Pyongyang officials to lead a recovery effort. His ruling party also pledged harsh punishment for the city and provincial officials, stating that they failed to protect the residents from the disaster. Kim fired Kim Song-il, who was chairman of the South Hamgyong Province Workers' Party of Korea Committee.

At the 8th Congress of the Workers' Party of Korea, held in early January 2021, Kim delivered a nine-hour-long report in which he admitted failures in carrying out the economic plan and lambasted leading officials' shortcomings. He also praised the country's nuclear capability and addressed the United States as the DPRK's main enemy. The congress restored the operative functions of the General Secretary of the Workers' Party of Korea, a title previously awarded "eternally" to Kim Jong-il in 2012, and elected Kim Jong-un to it. In February 2021, state-run media began referring to Kim as "president" in English language articles. In November 2021, the South Korean National Intelligence Service reported that the North Korean government has begun using the term "Kim Jong-un-ism", in an effort to establish an independent ideological system centered on Kim. Analyst Ken Gause described this as Kim "now ready to put his stamp firmly on the regime".

In January 2022, a North Korean KCTV documentary, "2021, A Great Victorious Year", was released, which appeared to address Kim's sudden weight loss and infrequent public appearances. It said that Kim's body had "completely withered away" as he "suffered" for the people during 2021, completing tasks hitherto unpublicized while North Korea faced "challenges" and "worst-ever hardships".

In May 2022, North Korea announced that its first COVID-19 outbreak had started in April. In a meeting with the WPK, Kim ordered "all the cities and counties of the whole country to thoroughly lock down," and called for the mobilization of emergency reserve medical supplies. In the days that followed the country's announcement, hundreds of thousands of new cases of fevers were reported, as well as 27 related deaths related to fever of unidentified origins, among which one death was confirmed as from the Omicron variant according to state media outlet KCNA. Kim spoke further at a subsequent WPK meeting, stating that the virus had brought “great turmoil” to his country, and urged the party and people to remain unified and organized in their efforts to combat the virus. Kim went on to blame the crisis on incompetence and irresponsibility on the part of the party organizations, and also cast blame on “negligence including drug overdose due to lack of knowledge of treatment methods” as the reason for most of the deaths since the outbreak. As part of the country’s response to the COVID-19 outbreak, Kim stated that he looked to learn from the response mounted by China. By the end of May, North Korean state media reported the COVID-19 outbreak was “controlled and improved across the country” following a re-evaluation by Kim and the WPK.

Personal life

Personality 
Kenji Fujimoto, a Japanese chef who was Kim Jong-il's personal cook, described Kim Jong-un as "a chip off the old block, a spitting image of his father in terms of face, body shape, and personality". Kim is a fan of basketball, and his favorite teams include the Chicago Bulls and the Los Angeles Lakers.

On 26 February 2013, Kim Jong‑un met Dennis Rodman, which led many reporters to speculate that Rodman was the first American that Kim had met. During Rodman's trip, Vice magazine correspondent Ryan Duffy said that Kim was "socially awkward" and avoided eye contact.

According to Cheong Seong-chang of the Sejong Institute, Kim Jong-un has greater visible interest in the welfare of his people and engages in greater interaction with them than his father did.

South Koreans who saw Kim at the summit in April 2018 described him as straightforward, humorous, and attentive. After meeting him, Donald Trump said, "I learned he was a talented man. I also learned he loves his country very much." He added that Kim had a "great personality" and was "very smart".

Public image 
Forbes magazine ranked Kim as the 36th most powerful person in the world in 2018, the highest amongst Koreans.

In a 2013 poll, 61.7% of North Korean defectors in South Korea said that Kim Jong Un was probably supported by most of his countrymen, an increase from the 55.7% approval rating for his father in a similar survey done two years earlier.

In a poll of South Koreans conducted following the May 2018 inter-Korean summit, 78% of respondents said they trusted Kim, compared with 10% approval a couple months prior.

The nickname "Kim Fatty the Third" began trending among Chinese users of the websites Baidu and Sina Weibo in late 2016. In response, the North Korean government successfully petitioned the Chinese government to censor the nickname on all Chinese websites.

Wealth 
International Business Times reported Kim to have 17 luxury palaces around North Korea, a fleet of 100 (mostly European) luxury cars, a private jet, and a  yacht. Rodman described his trip to a private island owned by Kim Jong-un: "It's like Hawaii, Ibiza, or Aruba but he's the only one that lives there."

In 2012, Business Insider reported that there were "igns of a rise in luxury goods ... creeping out of North Korea since Kim Jong-un took over" and that his "wife Ri Sol-ju (리설주) was photographed holding what appeared to be an expensive Dior handbag, worth almost $1,594an average year's salary in North Korea". According to diplomatic sources, "Kim Jong-un likes to drink and party all night like his father and ordered the [imported sauna] equipment to help him beat hangovers and fatigue."

In 2018, Kim received delivery of two armored Mercedes-Maybach S600s, each valued at $500,000, through an illicit shipping network in violation of international sanctions.

Health 
In 2009, reports suggested that Kim Jong-un was a diabetic and suffered from hypertension. He is also known to smoke cigarettes.

Kim Jong-un did not appear in public for six weeks in September and October 2014. State media reported that he was suffering from an "uncomfortable physical condition". Previously he had been limping. When he reappeared, he was using a walking stick.

In April 2020, Kim was not seen in public for 20 days, leading to rumours that he was critically ill or dead. In June 2021, following a one-month-long absence from the public eye, outside observers noted that Kim had lost considerable amount of weight. It is speculated that he had lost .

Family 

On 25 July 2012, North Korean state media reported for the first time that Kim Jong-un was married to Ri Sol-ju. Ri, who was believed to be in her early 20s, had been accompanying Kim Jong-un to public appearances for several weeks prior to the announcement. According to a South Korean analyst, Kim Jong-il had hastily arranged the marriage after suffering a stroke in 2008, the two married in 2009, and they had a son in 2010. Dennis Rodman, after visiting in 2013, reported that they had a second newborn child, a daughter named Ju-ae. According to South Korean intelligence sources, the couple is believed to have had a third child, a daughter, in February 2017.

On 18 November 2022, Kim Jong-un was seen reviewing key military arsenals with his daughter Ju-ae. The two were seen together again at a gathering with missile scientists later in the same month.

Kim is sometimes accompanied by his younger sister Kim Yo-jong, who is said to be instrumental in creating his public image and organising public events for him. According to Kim Yong-hyun, a professor of North Korean studies at Dongguk University in Seoul, and others, the promotion of Yo-jong and others is a sign that "the Kim Jong-un regime has ended its co-existence with the remnants of the previous Kim Jong-il regime by carrying out a generational replacement in the party's key elite posts".

On 13 February 2017, Kim Jong-nam, the exiled half-brother of Kim Jong-un, was assassinated with the nerve agent VX while walking through Terminal 2 at Kuala Lumpur International Airport. Kim Jong-un is widely believed to have ordered the assassination.

Awards and honors
 Jubilee Medal "75 Years of Victory in the Great Patriotic War 1941–1945" (Russia, 2020) — awarded for his efforts at preserving the memory of Soviet soldiers who died during the Soviet–Japanese War (1945) and were buried in North Korea

See also 

 Kim Jong-un bibliography
 Residences of North Korean leaders
 List of Kim Jong-un's titles
 List of international trips made by Kim Jong-un
 Jeonju Gim (Kim)

Notes

References

Further reading 

 Frank, Rüdiger. "Political Economy and Ideology under Kim Jong Un." in Routledge Handbook of Contemporary North Korea (Routledge, 2020) pp. 56–74.

 
 
 Moreshead, Paul. "Review of The Secret Rise and Rule of Kim Jong Un" H-War, H-Net Reviews (December 2020). online
 
 Pardo, Ramon Pacheco. North Korea-US Relations: From Kim Jong Il to Kim Jong Un (2nd ed. Routledge, 2020). excerpt

External links 

 North Korea's Young Leader on Show – video report by The New York Times
 NSA Archive Kim Jong-Il: The "Great Successor"
 Official short biography  at Naenara
 Kim Jong-un's works at Publications of the DPRK

|-

|-

|-

|-

 
Living people
Age controversies
Leaders of the Workers' Party of Korea and its predecessors
Children of national leaders
Communist writers
Heads of state of North Korea
Kim Il-sung University alumni
Kim Jong-il
Korean nationalists
Marshals
North Korean atheists
North Korean generals
People from Pyongyang
Critics of religions
Politicide perpetrators
Members of the 6th Central Committee of the Workers' Party of Korea
Members of the 6th Politburo of the Workers' Party of Korea
Members of the 6th Presidium of the Workers' Party of Korea
Members of the 7th Presidium of the Workers' Party of Korea
Members of the 8th Presidium of the Workers' Party of Korea
21st-century North Korean writers
North Korean individuals subject to the U.S. Department of the Treasury sanctions
Specially Designated Nationals and Blocked Persons List
1982 births